Justice Baker may refer to:

Albert C. Baker (1845–1921), chief justice of the Supreme Court of Arizona Territory and an associate justice of the Arizona Supreme Court
Basil Baker (1871–1941), associate justice of the Arkansas Supreme Court
Beth Baker (born 1961), associate justice of the Montana Supreme Court
Darius Baker (1845–1926), associate justice of the Rhode Island Supreme Court
David Gordon Baker (1884–1958), chief justice of the South Carolina Supreme Court
David J. Baker Jr. (1834–1899), associate justice of the Supreme Court of Illinois
David L. Baker (fl. 1970s–2010s), associate justice of the Iowa Supreme Court
Francis E. Baker (1860–1924), associate justice of the Indiana Supreme Court
Grafton Baker (c. 1806–1881), chief justice of the Supreme Court of the New Mexico Territory
Hugh B. Baker (1882–1959), associate justice of the Rhode Island Supreme Court
James A. Baker (justice) (1931–2008), associate justice of the Texas Supreme Court
James Baker (Missouri judge) (1819–1910), associate justice of the Supreme Court of Missouri
James McNair Baker (1821–1892), associate justice of the Florida Supreme Court
Joshua G. Baker (1852–1935), associate justice of the Louisiana Supreme Court
Karen R. Baker (born 1963), associate justice of the Arkansas Supreme Court
Walter Arnold Baker (1937–2010), associate justice of the Kentucky Supreme Court

Mr Justice Baker may refer to the following judges of the High Court of England and Wales:
Andrew Baker (born 1965)
Jeremy Baker (born 1958)
Jonathan Baker (judge) (born 1955)

See also
Judge Baker (disambiguation)